Judge Mathis is an American syndicated arbitration-based reality court show presided over by Judge Greg Mathis, a former judge of Michigan's 36th District Court and Black-interests motivational speaker/activist.

The courtroom series premiered on Monday, September 13, 1999-2023. The first-run syndication broadcast features Judge Mathis adjudicating small claims disputes from his studio courtroom set. The series is NAACP Image Award winning, as well as the first court show featuring an African American jurist to win Daytime Emmy Award for Outstanding Legal/Courtroom Program.

Judge Mathis is produced by Telepictures Productions and Syndicated Productions, while distributed by Warner Bros. Domestic Television Distribution. The courtroom series is filmed in front of a studio audience at the NBC Tower in Chicago, but includes cases and litigants from other U.S. jurisdictions.

Of the court shows currently in production, Judge Mathis is the third longest-running, behind only Divorce Court and The People's Court, respectively. As Divorce Court and The People's Court have also faced numerous judge-role casting changes, Mathis is the second longest reigning judge in television court show history, behind only Judy Sheindlin (Judge Judy and Judy Justice) by 3 years. In February 2023, it was confirmed that the 24th season would be its last. Shortly after, Byron Allen’s Allen Media Group had ordered a new series starting Mathis known as Mathis Court With Judge Mathis, slated for a fall 2023 release in syndication and on Justice Central.

Judge Greg Mathis

Case handling and adjudicating approach

Mathis typically begins proceedings by immediately giving the plaintiff the floor, having him/her expound on their side of the dispute in its entirety to gain insight into the matters. Mathis subsequently grants the defendant the same opportunity. Cases on Judge Mathis tend to go deeper and to more revealing places than those of most other court shows. He calls attention to peculiarities or juicy details exposed throughout the proceedings as a means of making the cases more stimulating to viewers. More open and unreserved in his personal beliefs than other judges, Mathis never hesitates to tackle serious, topical societal issues, political and mental health matters, and any other touchy subjects that emerge during the proceedings. Not one to shy away from disclosing his liberal mindset, Mathis ties in his social justice and rehabilitation perspectives into the cases.

While hearing the testimonies, Mathis takes on a relaxed, attentive, understanding, and open-minded nature. Rarely missing an opportunity to jest or poke fun, however, Mathis is given to wit and humor, also good-natured ridicule and ribbing of the parties, often rousing his audience to uproarious amusement. He sometimes cuts the tension–even tension he has fostered–with wisecracks or playfully taunting remarks. Mathis has bantered directly at audience members on occasion, also resulting in audience amusement. A trademark, Mathis sporadically uses a rather high-pitched voice to stultify litigants in a manner that suggests they've acted foolishly or have not recognized the obvious.

Combined with his teasing and comedic tendencies on the bench, Mathis is known for his street smart; urban expressions; and, once he has closely observed, reasoned back and forth and taken a stance on the litigants and matters brought before him, his stern, shaming and firmly lecturing side as well. Occasionally, Mathis leaves the courtroom to deliberate and then returns with his verdict. Upon final judgment, he may briefly explain the legal principle guiding his verdict, especially if his ruling is based on a particular state's law. Reportedly, Mathis's rulings conform to the laws of the state where the case was originally filed. In recent years, the show has begun to conduct paternity testing in disputes about child custody, and drug testing if applicable. Mathis often offers or compels drug treatment and family counseling for those parties in need.

Coming-of-age journey fused with court show
As a child and teenage delinquent, Mathis found himself embroiled in frequent legal woes. He was a member of a street gang in Detroit, and he was arrested and sentenced to jail for illegally carrying a firearm when he was 17 years old.

Mathis was brought up in one of the worst housing projects in Detroit while raised by a single mother. During his youth, he was involved with gangs (most notably the Errol Flynns gang), dropped out of school and spent time behind bars. Growing up as a gang member and heroin dealer in the mean streets of Detroit, Michigan, Mathis had done plenty of time in juvenile detention centers before age 17. All this changed when a judge gave him an ultimatum—either get a G.E.D. or go to jail. At the same time, Mathis found out his mother was dying of cancer. Rushing to her side, he promised her he'd turn his life around, which he did: he attended college; attended law school, earned a Juris Doctor degree, and passed the bar.

Mathis has frequently used his courtroom series to highlight his troubled-youth-turned-success story as a way of motivating and inspiring his audience (especially the youth audience) that there's no adversity that they can't pick themselves up from. It is from his background that Mathis derives much of his arbitration formula and television show theme. For example, the court show's title sequence music video throughout the early seasons of the program consisted of a brief dedication to Mathis's life story, Mathis narrating with the lines: "I was raised in the streets, arrested several times as a kid. But I didn't give up. I went from jail to judge in 15 years. And that's when I began to make a difference giving back through public service. I believed in myself and I believe in every single person that comes into this courtroom. I know people can change, obstacles can be overcome, and great success can be achieved. Because in my courtroom it happens every day". Mathis later shared that he took the job as television arbitrator on the condition that his life story was shared as part of the opening for each episode.

In the same likeness of his experience, Mathis takes a distinct admiration for litigants who have seen the error of their troubled ways and have made efforts to improve and better their lives. Mathis also makes efforts to promote treatment and programs for individuals struggling with drug and alcohol addictions.

Veteran court show status and honors

Outlasting other court shows and TV judges
By the 2014–15 television season, Judge Mathis made it to its 16th season, making Mathis the longest-serving African American and Black court show arbitrator, surpassing Joe Brown (Judge Joe Brown), whose program lasted 15 seasons. Moreover, Mathis holds the record for second-longest serving court show arbitrator ever, just behind Judge Judy Sheindlin, the presiding judge of the court show Judge Judy and its spin-off series Judy Justice.

Judge Mathis entered its milestone 20th season on Monday, September 3, 2018, and currently is presiding in his 24th season of the program (2022–23). The success of Judge Mathis is particularly noteworthy in that, generally speaking, court show programming has a very limited shelf life. The programs in this genre are lucky to make it past a few seasons. Judge Mathis is the fourth longest-running courtroom series behind Judge Judy, The People's Court (2nd longest running), and Divorce Court (longest running). Though both Divorce Court and The People's Court have experienced a series of cancellations/revival reincarnations and shifting arbitrators, Judge Mathis has not. Consequently, of the court shows with a single production life, Judge Mathis is the second longest-running (second only to Judge Judy by three seasons).

Of the long list of court shows, the only programs still in production in the genre originating from the 1990s or prior are Divorce Court (1957), The People's Court (1981), and Judge Mathis (1999). Of those three, only Judge Mathis has not suffered temporary cancellations amid its series run. Also of the three, Mathis is the only arbitrator to have hosted his program for the entirety of its run.

Court show success vs congressional run opportunity
From 2017 into early 2018 during the program's 19th season, Mathis considered ending his courtroom series as he was heavily encouraged by his hometown community to run for congressman of Detroit, Michigan. Due to the successful direction and longevity of his television series, Mathis eventually opted against the congressional opportunity in favor of carrying on the Judge Mathis program. Mathis stated he would like to do his court show for as long as he can. In Mathis's words, “It’s really not up to me. It’s up to the viewers. I enjoy what we do, particularly the last several years, when we were able to focus a lot more and put more resources, thanks to Warner Brothers and Telepictures, toward changing lives." Mathis expressed value in his court show's influence on drug and alcohol addicts to enroll in rehabilitation, its offering of paternity test results to litigators and providing counseling to troubled parties.

20th season anniversary
Mathis has stated that from the beginning, he only expected his court show to last 3 seasons. Judge Mathis is one of the longest-running, successful programs in the court show genre. Since the 2018–19 television season, it's one of two courtroom programs to have existed for two decades under one arbitrator. As of fall 2021 with the departure of Judge Judy, Judge Mathis is now the only program currently still in production to have existed for over two decades under one arbitrator.

Awards
Judge Greg Mathis's "inspirational and positive messages to young people" won the court show a PRISM Commendation in May 2002. The court show went on to win an NAACP Image Award for Outstanding News/Information – Series in 2004. In April 2018, the court show won a Daytime Emmy Award for Outstanding Legal/Courtroom Program, just ahead of making its milestone 20th season.

When Judge Mathis was crowned the winner of the Daytime Emmy Award in 2018, it became the first courtroom series with an African American jurist to win the award. In his acceptance speech for his first-ever Emmy win, he credited his diverse staff of females and minorities:

We are very proud and honored to have been awarded this Emmy. And after 20 years, I'm so happy for my staff in particular and the diversity that they represent. The majority of our staff are females and minorities. And in this day of the Me Too movement, I think this shows that if you hire more women and have a more diverse staff, you'll win.

On May 4, 2022, Mathis was honored with a star on the Hollywood Walk of Fame.

Production and broadcast specifics

On-air format, broadcast schedule, execution methods
Each episode runs for one hour and typically consists of 4 cases. The show is broadcast five days a week in every U.S. state, as well as Canada through Omni Television.

The cases on Judge Mathis are classified as tort law civil disputes with a maximum $5,000 claim, a typical amount for small claims court. The producers of the show select the cases. To acquire cases, the show solicits real-life litigants with pending disputes or individuals with potential disputes.

If litigants agree to be on the show, they are paid a talent fee ranging from $150 to $300, and they receive travel accommodations. Mathis has prior knowledge of the cases. In all cases, litigants give their prospective case managers all evidence in advance. Any outside legal case pending must be dismissed by both parties.

Typically, Mathis's producers only seek cases that they deem juicy and sensational enough for television.

Location
Each case's litigators enter the second-floor studio at the NBC Tower separately and plead their case in front of a studio audience. The show pays for the litigants' travel and hotel fees, provided by a small stipend for those selected to appear before Mathis, standard practice for courtroom television programming.

Mathis, which films from the NBC Tower in Chicago, Illinois, reported that production consulted him about shooting the court show from Los Angeles, California. Production had expressed interest in Mathis being closer to the rest of the celebrity industry. Although he considered this suggestion, Mathis vehemently denied the option. In Mathis's words, "I didn't want to interrupt the success. I felt that it was working well, so why disturb that? Secondly, I just love Chicago a lot more than Los Angeles.”

COVID-19 precautionary updates for season 22
Like most television program seasons premiering in the fall of 2020 amid the COVID-19 pandemic, Judge Mathis was forced to enter into a new season (its 22nd) in resourceful fashion. As Judge Mathis cases are pre-taped well in advance of airing for editing purposes, the program had to shoot cases during the height of the pandemic.

Unlike other courtroom programs, Greg Mathis, the bailiff, the litigators and the audience all initially presented in person (as opposed to virtually). That being said, by September 7, 2020, when the series premiered its 22nd season, there were a host of on-set precautionary measures in place: a significantly depopulated courtroom audience; all members of the audience widely distanced from one another; all audience members wearing clear plastic face shields; Bailiff Doyle wearing a disposable surgical face mask; a structure bearing a large window placed between Judge Mathis and his litigators; etc. In this manner, Mathis and his litigators all remained unmasked throughout the court proceedings.

These COVID-19 measures were later updated that same season: the litigants, along with their witnesses if necessary, presented testimony from remote locations through webcam. Video monitors were set up in Mathis's courtroom on the litigant podiums. Mathis himself along with Baliff Doyle presented to the courtroom in person, however.

Bailiffs and supporting roles 
Judge Mathiss current bailiff, Doyle Devereux has been with the program for most of its series run, since January 2003, midway into the court show's 4th season. It was revealed in an Hour Detroit news publication that Devereux was never a real-life bailiff, however, rather an actor cast by the program to play the role of one. In Doyle's words, "The show is real, the cases are real, you guys are real. If there’s something that could be a little fake about this show, it’s me."

Before Devereux, Kevin Lingle was the court show's bailiff for a short duration during the show's 4th season as well.

The court show's first bailiff, Brendan Anthony Moran, died on 19 December 2002 after he fell to his death from the balcony of his 24th-floor Chicago condo. His death was ruled a suicide, although Moran's family think differently.

In the first season of the Judge Mathis show, Leslie (Pallotta) Merrill, a former news anchor for WPGH Pittsburgh became the show's court reporter. Her role was to interview the litigants after Judge Mathis passed judgment and rendered his verdict on each case. She left the show after season 1. For the reminder of  the series, Judge Mathis did not have a court reporter.

Crossovers and other media personalities 

 In a 2005 episode, Mathis goes toe-to-toe with performance artist Max Geller about whether Geller is technically a father for donating to a Feed the Children campaign.
 In a September 2014 Rickey Smiley Morning Show interview, Judge Mathis expressed praise towards his courtroom rivals. In the interview, he was asked what three other court show judges he'd most enjoy sharing a meal with. For his first choice, he answered "Are you kidding? It would be Judge Judy at the head of the table. Oh, my goodness, that Judge Judy is something else." His second choice was Judge Marilyn Milian, and his third was Judge Mills Lane.
 On October 29, 2015, during a 17th season episode of Judge Mathis, People's Court arbitrator Judge Marilyn Milian made a surprise appearance on Judge Mathis, interrupting one of Mathis's courtroom proceedings. In the episode, she entered through the door to the left of the bench that Judge Mathis uses to enter and exit the courtroom and states, "Hey, hey, hey! Excuse me! Let a real judge do this." Following that, she exchanged greetings and hugs with Judge Mathis, who responded, "That's right. She taught me all I know, the best judge on The People's Court. I'm going to get some consultation from her in the back." In response, Judge Milian stated, "The realest [sic] judge I know."
 In a January 2018 interview, Mathis suggested that he tried emulating Judge Judy early on and received input that his gender and race made this approach short-lived. In speaking in the early days of his courtroom series, Mathis stated:I tried to be like Judge Judy. And she was mean all the time. And then ultimately [my] producers said, ‘Well, no, an older white woman can talk to white folks like that, but a young black man can't.’  So I learned that lesson early on. White folks love to see black people sing and dance. So instead I decided to just be myself.
Judge Mathis also took care to note of his high opinion of Judge Judy. He stated that he did not deserve Sheindlin's salary, that her salary is owed to her because of her impressive ratings, and that she even "ran Oprah off television" with ratings that surpassed even The Oprah Winfrey Show at various points of that show's run, such as Oprah's final season.

International versions

References

External links 
 
Judge Mathis Episode Guide
 

American comedy television series
1990s American legal television series
2000s American legal television series
2010s American legal television series
1999 American television series debuts
First-run syndicated television programs in the United States
Television series by Warner Bros. Television Studios
Arbitration courts and tribunals
Court shows
Television series by Telepictures
Daytime Emmy Award for Outstanding Legal/Courtroom Program winners